Mexico–Romania relations are the diplomatic relations between Mexico and Romania. Both nations are mutual members of the United Nations and the World Trade Organization.

History 

Knowledge of Mexico in Romania goes back to the early sixteenth century when a series of manuscripts on pre-Columbian priests and cultures circulated in Romania. In the seventeenth century, maize (originally a crop from Mexico) was introduced to Romania and in subsequent centuries, Romania would become one of the largest producers of the crop. During the Second French intervention in Mexico, several Romanian soldiers participated with the French army sent by Napoleon III to assist Emperor Maximilian I of Mexico.

The first official contact between Mexico and Romania was in April 1880 when Prince Carol I of Romania sent a letter to Mexican President Porfirio Díaz informing him of Romania's independence from the Ottoman Empire by the Treaty of Berlin in 1878. Diplomatic relations between Mexico and Romania were officially established on 20 July 1935 in Paris between foreign ministers of both nations. In 1941, former Romanian King Carol II observed Mexico's Independence Day parade alongside Mexican President Manuel Ávila Camacho. On 24 December 1941, diplomatic relations were severed by Mexico when Romania joined the Axis Powers during World War II.

In March 1973 diplomatic relations were re-established between both nations. Soon afterward, embassies were opened in both nations capitals respectively. In September 1989, Mexico closed its embassy in Bucharest for financial reasons; however, the embassy was re-opened in 1995. In 1974, Romanian President Nicolae Ceaușescu became the first Romanian head of state to pay an official visit to Mexico. Since the initial visit, there have been several high-level visits between both nations. In 2015, both nations celebrated the 80th anniversary since the establishment of diplomatic relations.

In February and March 2022, Mexico sent military transport planes to Romania to pick-up Mexican citizens, their Ukrainian family members and Latin-American citizens who resided and left Ukraine due to the Russian invasion of Ukraine. The Mexican government also donated humanitarian supplies to Ukrainian refugees in Romania.

High-level visits

High-level visits from Mexico to Romania

 Foreign Minister Jorge Castañeda y Álvarez de la Rosa (1979)
 Foreign Minister Rosario Green (1999)

High-level visits from Romania to Mexico

 President Nicolae Ceaușescu (1974)
 President Emil Constantinescu (2000)
 President Ion Iliescu (2002)
 Prime Minister Victor Ponta (2015)

Bilateral agreements
Both nations have signed several bilateral agreements such as an Agreement on Scientific and Technical Cooperation (1974); Agreement on Cinematographic and Touristic Cooperation (1974); Agreement on Economic, Industrial, Farming and Environmental Cooperation (1974); Agreement on the Peaceful use of Nuclear Energy (1974); Agreement on Mining and Energy Cooperation (1974); Agreement on Oil and Petrochemical Cooperation (1974); Agreement on Cultural, Youth and Sports Cooperation (1999) and an Agreement on the Avoidance of Double Taxation and Tax Evasion (2001).

Trade
In 1997, Mexico and the European Union (which includes Romania who joined the union in 2007) signed a free trade agreement. In 2018, two-way trade between both nations amounted to US$632 million. Mexico's main exports to Romania include: building materials, automobile parts, paper, beer and tequila. Romania's main exports to Mexico include: cylinders, circuits, automobile parts and fiber optic cables. Mexican multinational companies Cemex and Grupo Alfa operate in Romania.

Resident diplomatic missions
 Mexico has an embassy in Bucharest.
 Romania has an embassy in Mexico City.

See also 
 Romanian Mexicans

References 

 
Romania
Bilateral relations of Romania